Swami Tathagatananda (15 February 1923 – 25 June 2016), was a Hindu monk of the Ramakrishna Math and Ramakrishna Mission. He was the Minister and Spiritual Leader of the Vedanta Society of New York from November 1977 to June 2016, which was the first Vedanta Society in the United States, founded my Swami Vivekananda in 1895.

Born as Laxminarayan Bhattacharya in West Bengal, India, he was initiated in 1945 into the spiritual order by Swami Virajananda, a disciple of Sarada Devi and secretary of Swami Vivekananda. He officially joined the Ramakrishna Order as a brahmachari (trainee-student monk) in 1955 and had his sannyasa diksha (bestowal of full monkhood in accordance with the Hindu Advaita-Vedanta tradition) from Swami Madhavananda in 1965.

Tathagatananda served as the Assistant Minister of Vedanta Society of New York from February 1977 under Swami Pavitrananda. He became the Minister of the Vedanta Society of New York in November 1977 after the sudden passing away of Swami Pavitrananda on 18 November 1977.

Before going to the United States, Tathagatananda worked at Saradapitha, Deoghar Vidyapith, Chennai Students’ Home as an assistant. He was the head of Baranagore Mission Ashrama during the year 1975.

Works
Tathagatananda has written, translated, and edited books in English and Bengali.

Books in English
Alasinga Perumal : A Rare Disciple of Swami Vivekananda
Albert Einstein : His Human Side 
Basic Ideas of Hinduism and How it is Transmitted 
Celebrating Shri Ramakrishna : 175th Birth Anniversary
Celebrating Swami Vivekananda : Essays for the 150th Birth Anniversary
Glimpses of Great Lives 
Healthy Values of Living
Journey of the Upanishads to the West 
Light from the Orient : Essays on the Impact of India's Literature in the West 
Meditation on Shri Ramakrishna and Swami Vivekananda
Meditation on Swami Vivekananda  
Relief of Tension, Depression and Anxiety through Spiritual Living (also available in Spanish) 
Some Inspiring Illustrations of Shri Ramakrishna, Holy Mother and Swamiji and Their Love 
The Vedanta Society of New York : A Brief Survey

Books in Bengali
Albert Einstein o tar Manabik Satta
Mahabharat Katha
Mahat Jivane Param Satyer Abhasita Alo
Prachyer Alo
Ramayan Katha
Shubho Chinta
Tridhara

References

External links

 Vedanta Society, New York website

1923 births
2016 deaths
Hindu monks
People from West Bengal
Headmasters of Baranagore Ramakrishna Mission Ashrama High School